Narayan Singh Burdak is an Indian National Congress politician from Sikar district in Rajasthan, India. He was Pradesh Congress Committee President of Rajasthan until 13 April 2005. Between 1988-1989 he was a minister in the Rajasthan government.

He was born at village Dukiya in Danta Ramgarh tehsil in Sikar district. His father is Panna Ram Burdak. He is married to Mohani Devi.

Achievements
Member of Vidhan Sabha:

1972 Dantaram Garh Indian National Congress
1980 Dantaram Garh Indian National Congress
1985 Dantaram Garh Indian National Congress
1993 Dantaram Garh Indian National Congress
2003 Dantaram Garh Indian National Congress
2013 Dantaram Garh Indian National Congress
Municipal Corporations: Zilapramukh, Pradhan, Sarpanch, Panch
Experience as a Minister: 1988-89

References 

Rajasthani politicians
People from Sikar district
Living people
Members of the Rajasthan Legislative Assembly
Year of birth missing (living people)
Indian National Congress politicians from Rajasthan